The 1998 Michigan State Spartans football team competed on behalf of Michigan State University in the Big Ten Conference during the 1998 NCAA Division I-A football season. Head coach Nick Saban was in his fourth season with the Spartans.  Michigan State played their home games at Spartan Stadium in East Lansing, Michigan.  The Spartans went 6–6 overall and 4–4 in conference play. The team did not play a bowl game following the 1998 regular season.

Schedule

Rankings

Roster

Coaching Staff
Nick Saban – Head Coach
Gary Tranquill – Offensive Coordinator/quarterbacks coach
Bobby Williams – Running backs coach
Charlie Baggett – Wide receivers coach
Mike Cummings – Tight ends coach/special teams coordinator
Pat Ruel – Offensive line coach
Chris Cosh – Defensive Coordinator
Todd Grantham – Defensive line coach
Bill Sheridan – Linebackers coach
Mark Dantonio – Defensive backs coach

1999 NFL Draft
The following players were selected in the 1999 NFL Draft.

References

Michigan State
Michigan State Spartans football seasons
Michigan State Spartans football